Kelford is a town in Bertie County, North Carolina, United States. The population was 251 at the 2010 census.

Geography
Kelford is located at  (36.180914, -77.221660).

Demographics

As of the census of 2000, there were 245 people, 99 households, and 51 families residing in the town. The population density was 481.3 people per square mile (185.5/km2). There were 116 housing units at an average density of 227.9 per square mile (87.8/km2). The racial makeup of the town was 32.65% White, 65.31% African American, and 2.04% from two or more races.

There were 99 households, out of which 24.2% had children under the age of 18 living with them, 25.3% were married couples living together, 19.2% had a female householder with no husband present, and 47.5% were non-families. 44.4% of all households were made up of individuals, and 26.3% had someone living alone who was 65 years of age or older. The average household size was 2.47 and the average family size was 3.69.

In the town, the population was spread out, with 29.8% under the age of 18, 9.4% from 18 to 24, 20.0% from 25 to 44, 24.9% from 45 to 64, and 15.9% who were 65 years of age or older. The median age was 38 years. For every 100 females, there were 87.0 males. For every 100 females age 18 and over, there were 75.5 males.

The median income for a household in the town was $21,750, and the median income for a family was $29,375. Males had a median income of $22,000 versus $20,972 for females. The per capita income for the town was $9,945. About 22.6% of families and 27.5% of the population were below the poverty line, including 32.9% of those under the age of eighteen and 44.7% of those 65 or over.

Education
 West Bertie Elementary School

Notable people
 Kent Bazemore, NBA player for the Sacramento Kings
 Jessica Breland, WNBA player for the Chicago Sky

References

Towns in Bertie County, North Carolina
Towns in North Carolina